Landanichthys is an extinct genus of prehistoric bony fish that lived during the Danian stage of the Paleocene epoch.

References

Paleocene fish
Prehistoric perciform genera